Kingdom Hearts is a series of action role-playing games developed and published by Square Enix (formerly Square). It is the result of a collaboration between Square Enix and Disney Interactive Studios, combining characters and elements from Square Enix's Final Fantasy series and multiple Disney franchises. Currently the series includes seven video games released on various platforms, a manga series, a novel series, video game soundtracks released on audio CDs, and a collectible card game.

The video games provide the canonical story of the series. The manga series is adapted by Shiro Amano and the novels are written by Tomoco Kanemaki and illustrated by Shiro Amano. The stories follow the events that take place in the video games with differences to account for the loss of interactivity that a video game provides. The manga and novel series are both divided up into three series based on each of the three main video games. Each series is further broken up into multiple volumes. The manga was originally serialized in Japan by Square's Monthly Shonen Gangan, but has since been released worldwide. The manga was released in the United States by Tokyopop near the end of 2005, but was discontinued in 2008.

Games

Video games

Each game in the series has been critically and commercially successful, though each title has seen different levels of success. As of December 2006, the Kingdom Hearts series has shipped over 10 million copies worldwide, with 2.0 million copies in PAL regions, 3.0 million copies in Japan, and 5.6 million copies in North America. The main games in the series were released in chronological order, with each new game following the  events of the previous. The exception is the V CAST mobile game, which was developed independently of Square Enix's games. Three new titles in the series were announced at the 2007 Tokyo Game Show. Coded and Mobile were only released for Japan. Kingdom Hearts III is the latest game of the series, being released in North America on January 29, 2019.

Collectible card game
The Kingdom Hearts Trading Card Game is a collectible card game based on the Kingdom Hearts series. It was first released in Japan to coincide with the release of Chain of Memories and was produced by Tomy. The TCG features starter decks, playing mats, and booster packs. In 2007, Fantasy Flight Games acquired the rights to translate the game and market it in North America. In the game, the player takes the role of Sora from the Kingdom Hearts games. Using the cards, players travel to worlds to battle the Heartless. The game allows for two players with a deck and "Player Card" to play together. The game is distributed in a variety of booster packs. The game was released in North America on November 15, 2007.

Soundtracks

The music of the video game series Kingdom Hearts was composed by Yoko Shimomura with orchestral music arranged by Kaoru Wada. The original soundtracks of each game have been released on two albums and a third compilation album. The games feature two main theme songs, which were written and performed by Hikaru Utada, as well as music from Disney films.

Printed media

Manga
The plot of the manga, drawn by Shiro Amano, stays true to the events in the video games, though it does diverge at certain points. Certain fights were shortened or excluded and some minor characters and worlds visited in the game were also excluded. The fourth series, Kingdom Hearts 358/2 Days, is currently being serialized. The first series was re-released in three volumes in Japan in December 2006 as "Kingdom Hearts: Final Mix". The manga series has been well received. Several of the manga volumes were listed on USA Today's "Top 150 best sellers". The highest ranked volume was Kingdom Hearts volume 4 at #73. Every volume listed stayed on the list for at least two weeks; Kingdom Hearts volume 4 stayed the longest at four weeks. However, due to Tokyopop's 2008 restructuring, the Kingdom Hearts manga series was cancelled after the 2nd volume of Kingdom Hearts II'''s manga was released.

Kingdom Hearts

Kingdom Hearts: Chain of Memories

Kingdom Hearts II

Kingdom Hearts Final Mix

Kingdom Hearts 358/2 Days

Novels
A novel series has also been released in Japan. Like the manga series, it is divided up into separate series based on the games. Yen Press began releasing the novels in English-language omnibus editions in 2015.

Kingdom Hearts

Kingdom Hearts: Chain of Memories

Kingdom Hearts II

Kingdom Hearts 358/2 Days

Kingdom Hearts Birth by Sleep

Kingdom Hearts 3D: Dream Drop Distance

Companion books
There have been numerous books that provide walkthroughs and supplemental information to the video games. Square Enix has released six Ultimania guides and one bonus book on the Kingdom Hearts'' series exclusively in Japan. The Ultimania guides primarily serve as strategy guides for their respective games, revealing secrets from the developers' perspective. They also contain interviews with the staff, extended information on backstory, and original artwork. In North America, BradyGames has been given exclusive rights to publish strategy guides for the games.

References

External links
 Kingdom Hearts Japan official portal
 Kingdom Hearts North America official portal

Manga series
Tokyopop titles
Media lists by video games franchise
Mass media by franchise